The 48th Armored Division was a division of the United States Army National Guard from September 1946 until 1968. Most of its units were part of the Florida Army National Guard and the Georgia Army National Guard. From 1946 to 1955 it was an infantry division. During World War II the denotation 48th Infantry Division was a 'phantom division' created for Operation Quicksilver, part of Operation Fortitude South II.

History

48th Infantry Division (National Guard)
The 48th "Hurricane" Infantry Division was formed on 15 September 1946 of Florida and Georgia National Guardsmen.  The division conducted its first annual training from 18 July to 1 August 1948 at Fort Jackson.

48th Armored Division (National Guard)
On 1 November 1955, the division was reorganized as an armored division

The 124th Infantry Regiment of the Florida ARNG was assigned on 5 July 1946 to the 48th Infantry Division. It was broken up on 1 November 1955 and its elements, the 124th Armored Infantry Battalion and the 154th Armored Infantry Battalion were both assigned to the 48th Armored Division. The 124th and 154th Armored Infantry Battalions were consolidated 15 April 1959 to form the 124th Infantry, a parent regiment under the Combat Arms Regimental System, to consist of the 1st and 2d Armored Rifle Battalions, elements of the 48th Armored Division.

"To prepare for challenges in Western Europe, the new troop basis authorized the conversion of four National Guard infantry divisions to armored divisions." Georgia, and Florida agreed to convert and on 1 November 1955 the 48th Division was redesignated as an armored division. When the 51st Infantry Division was inactivated in 1963, some of its units, both from Florida and South Carolina, were assigned to the 48th Armored Division. On 1 October 1957 the 48th Armored Division headquarters was transferred from Macon, Georgia, to Jacksonville, Florida, as Major General Maxwell Snyder took command.

When the Army National Guard experienced its next major reorganization in 1967, the 48th Armored Division was chosen for inactivation, which occurred on 1 January 1968.

Soldiers and units in Florida were assigned to the 53d Infantry Brigade, predecessor to today's 53d Infantry Brigade Combat Team.  The number "48" was carried on by the Georgia National Guard and is today the 48th Infantry Brigade Combat Team.

Commanders
Maj. Gen. Henry D. Russell, Georgia National Guard (3 July 1946 - 6 February 1951)
Maj. Gen. Joseph C. Hutchinson, Florida National Guard (7 February 1951 –  29 February 1952)
Maj. Gen. Joseph B. Fraser, Georgia Army National Guard (1 March 1952  - 1 August 1955)
Maj. Gen. Patrick E. Seawright, Georgia Army National Guard (1 August 1955 – 1 October 1957)
Maj. Gen. Maxwell C. Snyder, Florida Army National Guard (1 October 1957 - July 1962)
Maj. Gen. Benjamin Merritt, Georgia Army National Guard (July 1962 - )

Notes

References
 Holt, Thaddeus. The Deceivers: Allied Military Deception in the Second World War. Phoenix. 2005. 
 Hesketh, Roger. Fortitude: The D-Day Deception Campaign. St Ermin's Press. 1999 
 Harris, Tomás & Seaman, Mark. Garbo: The Spy Who Saved D-Day. Public Record Office. 2000.

External links

48th Armored Division, U.S.
Divisions of the United States Army National Guard
Military units and formations established in 1946
Military units and formations disestablished in 1968
1968 disestablishments in Florida